Ocean Lake is located in the U. S. state of Wyoming about 17 miles northwest of Riverton. Ocean Lake resides within the 11,505-acre Ocean Lake Wildlife Habitat Management Area. It is an essential breeding ground for thousands of migratory waterfowl. Efforts have been made to enhance wildlife in the area with the construction of man-made ponds and nests.

See also
List of lakes of Wyoming
Two Ocean Lake

References

Lakes of Wyoming
Bodies of water of Fremont County, Wyoming